Noisiel is a railway station on RER train network in Noisiel, Seine-et-Marne.

Description

History 
Noisiel station opened on 19 December 1980, when RER line A was extended to Torcy, as well as Noisy–Champs and Lognes stations.

Traffic 
, the estimated annual attendance by the RATP Group was 3,016,034 passengers.

Transport

Train 
The average waiting time for trains to Paris and to Marne-la-Vallée–Chessy is 10 minutes. But during peak hours most trains bound to Chessy do not stop at Noisiel, and passengers may take the trains that are bound to Torcy.

Bus connections 

The station is served by several buses:
 Arlequin Bus network line: 10 (to Brie-Comte-Robert) ;
 Sit'bus Bus network line: C (to Pontault-Combault) ;
  Noctilien network night bus line:  (between Paris (Gare de Lyon) and Marne-la-Vallée–Chessy - Disneyland).

References

Réseau Express Régional stations
Railway stations in France opened in 1980
Railway stations in Seine-et-Marne